Crimson  is a rich, deep red color, inclining to purple.
It originally meant the color of the kermes dye produced from a scale insect, Kermes vermilio, but the name is now sometimes also used as a generic term for slightly bluish-red colors that are between red and rose. It is the national color of Nepal.

History
Crimson (NR4) is produced using the dried bodies of a scale insect, Kermes, which were gathered commercially in Mediterranean countries, where they live on the kermes oak, and sold throughout Europe. Kermes dyes have been found in burial wrappings in Anglo-Scandinavian York. They fell out of use with the introduction of cochineal, also made from scale insects, because although the dyes were comparable in quality and color intensity, it needed ten to twelve times as much kermes to produce the same effect as cochineal.

Carmine is the name given to the dye made from the dried bodies of the female cochineal, although the name crimson is sometimes applied to these dyes too. Cochineal appears to have been brought to Europe by the Spaniard Hernán Cortés during the conquest of the Aztec Empire and the name 'carmine' is derived from the French carmin. It was first described by Pietro Andrea Mattioli in 1549. The pigment is also called cochineal after the insect from which it is made.

Alizarin (PR83) is a pigment that was first synthesized in 1868 by the German chemists Carl Gräbe and Carl Liebermann and replaced the natural pigment madder lake. Alizarin crimson is a dye bonded onto alum which is then used as a pigment and mixed with ochre, sienna and umber. It is not totally colorfast.

Etymology
The word crimson has been recorded in English since 1400, and its earlier forms include cremesin, crymysyn and cramoysin (cf. cramoisy, a crimson cloth). These were adapted via Old Spanish from the Medieval Latin cremesinus (also kermesinus or carmesinus), the dye produced from Kermes scale insects, and can be traced back to Arabic qirmiz (قرمز)  ("red"), also borrowed in Turkic languages kırmız and many other languages, e.g. German Karmesin, Italian cremisi, French cramoisi, Portuguese carmesim, Dutch “karmozijn”, etc. (via Latin). The ultimate source may be Sanskrit कृमिज kṛmi-jā meaning "worm-made".

A shortened form of carmesinus also gave the Latin carminus, from which comes carmine.

Other cognates include the Persian ghermez "red" derived from "kermest" the red worm, Old Church Slavonic чрьвл҄ѥнъ (črьvl'enъ), archaic Russian чермный (čermnyj), Bulgarian червен (cherven), and Serbo-Croatian crven "red". Cf. also vermilion.

Dyes

Carmine dyes, which give crimson and related red and purple colors, are based on an aluminium and calcium salt of carminic acid. Carmine lake is an aluminium or aluminium-tin lake of cochineal extract, and crimson lake is prepared by striking down an infusion of cochineal with a 5 percent solution of alum and cream of tartar. Purple lake is prepared like carmine lake with the addition of lime to produce the deep purple tone. Carmine dyes tend to fade quickly.

Carmine dyes were once widely prized in both the Americas and in Europe. They were used in paints by Michelangelo and for the crimson fabrics of the Hussars, the Turks, the British Redcoats, and the Royal Canadian Mounted Police.

Nowadays carmine dyes are used for coloring foodstuffs, medicines and cosmetics. As a food additive in the European Union, carmine dyes are designated E120, and are also called cochineal and Natural Red 4'''. Carmine dyes are also used in some oil paints and watercolors used by artists.

In nature
The crimson tide which sometimes occurs on beaches is caused by a type of algae known as Karenia brevis.

Crimson rosellas are a subspecies of parrot that are common in Australia.
The crimson sunbird is the national bird of Singapore.
The crimson-breasted gonolek is an African bushshrike with a bright crimson breast.
Crimson clover (Trifolium incarnatum) is a clover species native to Europe
Crimson glory vine (Vitis coignetiae) is a vine species native to Asia
Hind's Crimson Star is an alternative name of the deep orange-red variable star R Leporis

In culture
Literature
In George R.R. Martin's series A Song of Ice and Fire, crimson is the family color of House Lannister.
There is a Space Marine chapter in Warhammer 40,000 called the "Crimson Fists", who also paint the left glove of every warrior a deep red.
In The Dark Tower VII: The Dark Tower by Stephen King, the principal antagonist is the Crimson King.
The Flash (Barry Allen), a DC Comics superhero, wears a red costume and runs at super-speed. He is sometimes called The Crimson Comet.

Music
"Crimson and Clover" (1968 song)
King Crimson (band)In the Court of the Crimson King (1969)
"The Court of the Crimson King"
W.A.S.P. - The Crimson Idol (album)
Crimson, white and indigo is how Jerry Garcia describes the American flag in “Standing on the Moon.”
Film
In Guillermo del Toro's 2015 gothic romance film Crimson Peak, the Sharpes' dilapidated mansion Allerdale Hall, which is steadily sinking into the red clay, is referred to as "Crimson Peak" due to the warm red clay seeping through the snow.

The 1952 film The Crimson Pirate  starred Burt Lancaster and Nick Cravat. Set late in the 18th century, on the fictional Caribbean islands of San Pero and Cobra, where a rebellion on Cobra is underway by the mysterious "El Libre". Pirate Captain Vallo captures the King's ship carrying His Majesty's envoy.

Nobility
In Polish, karmazyn (crimson) is a synonym for a magnate, i.e., a member of the rich, high nobility as only they may wear robing dyed from the scale insect.

Religion
In scriptures of the Baháʼí Faith, crimson stands for tests and sacrifice, among other things

Food
Rhubarb is sometimes poetically referred to as crimson stalks.

Military
The Danish hussar regiment's ceremonial uniform for enlisted members has a crimson pelisse.
A regiment of the British Army, The King's Royal Hussars still wears crimson trousers as successors to the 11th Hussars (the "Cherrypickers")
In the United States Army, crimson is the color of the Ordnance Corps.

School colors

Some Greek letter organizations use crimson as one of their official colors: Delta Sigma Theta (ΔΣΘ), Kappa Alpha Psi (ΚΑΨ), and Kappa Alpha Order (ΚΑ).
Crimson is the school color of several universities, including Harvard University, University of Kansas, Indiana University, Korea University, New Mexico State University, Saint Joseph's University, Tuskegee University, University of Alabama, University of Belgrano, University of Denver, University of Mississippi, University of Nebraska at Omaha, University of Oklahoma, University of Utah, Washington State University, Worcester Polytechnic Institute and University of Talca
The daily newspaper at Harvard is The Harvard Crimson.
The daily newspaper at Alabama is called The Crimson White''.
Harvard's athletic teams are the Crimson, and those of the University of Alabama are the Crimson Tide.

Vexillology
Crimson is the national color of Nepal and forms the background of the country's flag. It also appears on the flag of Poland.

See also
Alizarin crimson (color)
List of colors
Amaranth (color)
Ruby (color)
Scarlet
National symbols of Nepal
Red dye insects:
Armenian cochineal
Polish cochineal

References 

 
 Etymology OnLine

External links 

Quaternary colors
Food additives
Organic pigments
Natural dyes
Pigments
Shades of red